Earnest King (born 21 May 1846, date of death unknown) was a Barbadian cricketer. He played in two first-class matches for the Barbados cricket team in 1864/65 and 1865/66.

See also
 List of Barbadian representative cricketers

References

External links
 

1846 births
Year of death missing
Barbadian cricketers
Barbados cricketers
People from Saint Michael, Barbados